Maytag was an American home and commercial appliance company.

Maytag may also refer to:

Maytag (surname)
Maytag Dairy Farms
A term used in whitewater kayaking to refer to a person being stuck in a hole for an extended period of time